Jia Shen is an American technology entrepreneur best known as the co-founder of RockYou, a company that developed games and widgets for social networks, such as Myspace and Facebook. At RockYou, Jia led the company to acquire over 400 million users and raise over $140 million in investment.

In 2014, Shen founded the company PowerCore, which creates smart toys and branded merchandise for brands, such as Battle Tails, Mino Monsters, and Business Fish.

Most recently Shen leads the Asian efforts of Game Closure, the creator of EverWing on the Instant Games platform in Facebook Messenger and a launch partner on the LINE Quick Games platform.

During Shen's career, one of the biggest mistakes was the Largest password compilation of all time leaked online.

References 

American chief executives
Video game businesspeople
Entertainment industry businesspeople
Living people
Year of birth missing (living people)